Events from the year 1895 in Denmark.

Incumbents
 Monarch – Christian IX
 Prime minister – Tage Reedtz-Thott

Events

 1 April – The political struggle between Landstinget and Folketinget culminates with the government's dissolution of Rigsdagen and the adoption of a temporary national budget.
 22 June – Opening of the 1895 Copenhagen Women's Exhibition.

Sports
 15 October  Kolding IF is founded.

Date unknown
 Christian Ingemann woms a silver medal in men's sprint at the amateur event of the 1895 ICA Track Cycling World Championships.

Births
 17 September – Princess Margaret of Denmark (died 1992)
 4 October – Jens Søndergaard, painter (died 1957)
 5 October – Marie Gudme Leth, textile printer (died 1997)

Deaths
 1 January  Niels Peder Christian Holsøe, architect (born 1826)
 28 August – Clara Andersen, dramatist and novelist (born 1826)
 4 December – Johannes Helms, writer and schoolmaster (born 1828)

References

 
1890s in Denmark
Denmark
Years of the 19th century in Denmark